KJBL (96.5 FM) is a radio station licensed to Julesburg, Colorado, United States.  The station is owned by Armada Media - Mccook. 

Along with carrying classic hits, the station airs local high school football games. The station carries local news as well. Music on KJBL is primarily satellite fed.

History
The station was assigned the call letters KEGK on February 26, 1999.  On July 24, 2001, the station changed its call sign to KKAS and on July 7, 2004, to KKYT. After a period off air, on January 14, 2005, the station became the current KJBL. Beginning in 2005, the station aired primarily a country music format, however this soon was changed to classic hits.

References

External links

JBL
Classic hits radio stations in the United States
Radio stations established in 1999
1999 establishments in Colorado